Gareth Coker is a British composer.  He has composed work for video games including Ori and the Blind Forest, Ori and the Will of the Wisps, ARK: Survival Evolved, and Halo Infinite.

Life and career
Coker learned the piano at a very early age. In school, he joined the orchestra and a jazz band and later studied at the Royal Academy of Music pursuing a major in musical composition. He traveled and lived abroad in Japan for three years where he taught English and studied various ethnic instruments. He later moved to Los Angeles, where he juggled between composing for video games and the University of Southern California's film scoring program. Coker cites Alan Silvestri's score for Forrest Gump and Star Wars: X-Wing vs. TIE Fighter as inspirations to becoming a composer.

Ori and the Blind Forest 
In 2011, Coker composed the accompanying music to the game's prototype after studio director Thomas Mahler had stumbled upon his work. Speaking about the game's musical approach, Coker was given free rein by the studio to experiment with the music and scored the game mostly based on the visuals. He worked with the idea of using instruments that would represent the area. For example, using wood-based percussion instruments for the Ginso Tree area or winds in the ruins. He also worked closely with the game's programmers to balance the pacing and timing of the music. Coker recorded the score at Ocean Way Nashville Recording Studios with the Nashville Studio Orchestra.

The musical score was praised by critics and fans, garnering nominations for several industry awards including a BAFTA Game Award for Best Music. Kirk Hamilton of Kotaku appreciated the score's orchestral approach, comparing it to the works of Joe Hisaishi on the Studio Ghibli films. Yahoo's Ben Silverman called it "a wonderful score" and recalled how it was akin to the score of Howl’s Moving Castle.

Awards

Works

References

External links
 

Alumni of the Royal Academy of Music
Place of birth missing (living people)
Video game composers
Living people
21st-century British composers
Year of birth missing (living people)